The 7th California Infantry Regiment was an infantry regiment in the Union Army during the American Civil War.  It spent its entire term of service in the western United States, attached to the Department of the Pacific, serving in California and Arizona Territory.  They were known as the "Gold Diggers" in reference to the large number of recruits from the California's "Mother Lode" region.  Later, they were also called the "Hungry Seventh" for the privations they suffered in Arizona, particularly at Fort Mason.  The Regiment included many veterans of the Mexican–American War.

Regimental Flag
While the Regiment was being organized and trained at the Presidio of San Francisco, Jonathan D. Stevenson presented them with the regimental flag of the unit he commanded in the Mexican–American War: The 7th New York Volunteers.  The Regiment continued to carry this flag throughout its service, and it flew over Fort Mason during their time there.

Company assignments
Company A was organized at San Francisco and commanded by Captain James P. Olmstead until his death from brain congestion at Fort Yuma in August, 1865 when command was assumed by Captain James W. Bye. They were assigned to the Presidio of San Francisco in November, 1864, then to Fort Yuma in March, 1865, and finally Fort McDowell, Arizona Territory in September, 1865.
Company B was organized at Marysville and commanded by Captain Alexander Gibson. They were assigned to the Presidio of San Francisco in November, 1864, then to Tucson in May, 1865.
Company C was organized at Jackson and commanded by Captain Walter S. Cooledge. They were assigned to the Presidio of San Francisco in November, 1864, then to Fort Mojave in March, 1865.
Company D was organized at Dutch Flat and commanded by Captain M.H. Calderwood. They were assigned to the Presidio of San Francisco in January, 1865, then to Tubac, Arizona Territory in April, 1865, and Fort Mason, Arizona Territory the following September.
Company E was organized at San Francisco and commanded by Captain Hiram A. Messenger. They were assigned to the Presidio of San Francisco in November, 1864, then to Tubac, Arizona Territory in April, 1865, and Fort Mason, Arizona Territory the following September.
Company F was organized at San Francisco and commanded by Captain John W. Owen. They were assigned to the Presidio of San Francisco in December, 1864, then to Fort Yuma in June, 1865, then to Fort McDowell, Arizona Territory and Maricopa Wells in September, 1865.
Company G was organized at Placerville and commanded by Captain Thomas J. Heninger. They were assigned to the Presidio of San Francisco in October, 1864, then to Tubac, Arizona Territory in May, 1865, and Fort Mason, Arizona Territory the following September.
Company H was organized at Bear Valley and commanded by Captain James W. Smith. They were assigned to the Presidio of San Francisco in January, 1865, then to Fort Yuma the following May.
Company I was organized at Sacramento and commanded by Captain George D. Kendall. They were assigned to the Presidio of San Francisco in November, 1864, then to Fort Whipple, Arizona Territory the following May.
Company K was organized at San Francisco and commanded by Captain James H. Shepard until his resignation in January, 1866. They were assigned to the Presidio of San Francisco in November, 1864, then to Fort Yuma in March, 1865 then to Fort McDowell, Arizona Territory the following May.

Service At Tubac and Fort Mason
In the Spring of 1865, the Regimental Headquarters and Companies D, E, and G were assigned to Tubac, Arizona Territory. Though they were there primarily to operate against the Apaches, they were also assigned the job of reinforcing the International Line against potential incursions by the forces of the Mexican Empire and its French allies.  As part of the ongoing war of the French Intervention, Imperialist forces had made recent advances into the neighboring Mexican State of Sonora, causing considerable alarm among officials in the United States.

In September, the garrison was moved south to Calabazas, a small settlement near the border where they established a post called Post at Calabasas, later renamed Fort Mason. They were joined there by the 1st  Battalion of Native Cavalry, California Volunteers. Shortly afterward, Sonora Governor Ignacio Pesqueira, who had fled northward after his army had been destroyed in a series of battles with the Imperialists, arrived at the post with a small party seeking refuge.  Colonel Lewis put the post, his officers, and his men at the Governor's disposal.

Service at Fort Mason was generally considered miserable. Because of its somewhat swampy (by Arizona standards) location on the banks of the Santa Cruz River, the men suffered from an epidemic which at one point rendered over half of them too sick for duty and led to at least 25 deaths. The post suffered from supply problems as well. These conditions caused construction of permanent buildings at the post to slow to a halt, leaving the men to live in tents and temporary brush shelters during their service there and generally curtailing operations against the Apaches.  Participation in one campaign against the Apaches, for instance, was aborted by a lack of adequate shoes.

Despite this, the Seventh was, from time to time, able to put small expeditions into the field.  On one such occasion, Captain Hiram A. Messenger led a scouting party of 15 men into the Huachuca Mountains in July, 1865.  The detachment found itself surrounded and under attack by a reported 100 or 200 Apaches and escaped after a fortuitous rainstorm ended a fight that lasted over an hour and left two soldiers dead and one wounded.

The Regiment was ordered back to The Presidio in March, 1866 and was mustered out the following April and May.

See also
List of California Civil War Union units

References

The Civil War Archive, Union Regimental Index, California
  The War of the Rebellion: Volume 35, Part 1 CORRESPONDENCE, ORDERS, AND RETURNS RELATING TO OPERATIONS ON THE PACIFIC COAST FROM JULY 1, 1862, TO JUNE 30, 1865. By United States. War Dept, Robert Nicholson Scott, Henry Martyn WASHINGTON: GOVERNMENT PRINTING OFFICE. 1897
  Records of California men in the war of the rebellion 1861 to 1867, By California. Adjutant General's Office, SACRAMENTO: State Office, J. D. Young, Supt. State Printing. 1890. pp.688-719
Pvt John Haines 7th California Infantry Find a grave memorial
Units and formations of the Union Army from California
Military units and formations of the United States in the Indian Wars
Military units and formations established in 1864
1864 establishments in California
Military units and formations disestablished in 1866